El Cairo Airport  is an airstrip in the pampa of Beni Department in Bolivia.

See also

Transport in Bolivia
List of airports in Bolivia

References

External links 
OpenStreetMap - El Cairo
OurAirports - El Cairo
Fallingrain - El Cairo Airport
Google Maps - El Cairo

Airports in Beni Department